33 is the eighth studio album by Brazilian singer Wanessa Camargo. Originally the album was released on August 19, 2016 exclusively for free digital download through Palco MP3, Brazilian portal of execution of online music. On October 14, 2016 is released for digital sale through iTunes independently by its producer Work Show. At the end of 2016 the singer signs with Som Livre and on March 28, 2017, the album is re-released by the label - this time also in physical form - bringing two new songs as bonus. The album marks the transfer of the artist of pop to the sertanejo, musical genre that adopted from then on.

The first single of the album was "Coração Embriagado", composed by the sertanejo duo João Neto & Frederico in partnership with Gabriel of Cavaco, Shylton Fernandes and Diego Ferrari and was officially launched on the digital platforms on August 5. "Vai que Vira Amor" was released as a promotional single on July 26. "Anesthesia" was released as a second single on March 10, 2017.

Background
On August 22, 2014 the producer Mr. Jam confirmed that Wanessa began working on a new album unpublished, being produced by him. However, only on March 13, 2015 did the singer confirm that she was really engaged in the project, saying that it would take a few months to be released and citing her W album as a reference of what she was doing, claiming that she was seeking a sonority between pop and electronic. In April he confirmed that he was recording with producer César Lemos, who had previously worked with her on albums W and Meu Momento, using tracks "Amor, Amor" and "Sem Querer" as references of the material he was preparing. On July 8, during an interview for Quem magazine, she revealed that the new album would mix songs in English and Portuguese, since she had not recorded in the native language for six years: "It's a fusion of everything I did before with I'm always reinventing myself, looking for new things, but with more maturity." Soon after confirmed the partnership in compositions with Liah Soares and Junno Andrade.

On December 8, however, he announced that he gave up recording tracks in English and that the new album would be entirely in Portuguese, mixing dance songs and other romantic songs, returning the missing link before on the album Meu Momento. In addition, Wanessa revealed that he was composing again, which did not make the album cited, and intended to bring a mostly authorial work: "The album will be more personal than I could ever imagine. very introspective and mature, but will have more agitated bands." At the beginning of 2016 he photographed for the insert and dissemination of the new work, having the photos recorded by Fernando Mazza and the clothes signed by Alexandre Dornellas. According to her husband, Marcus Buaiz, the expectation was that the disc was released in May.

Recording and development

On May 17, Wanessa announces that he has crated the material he was recording until then and switched the producer team to make a redirection in his career, leaving pop music to focus on sertanejo music now. For this, it adopted again the surname Camargo in its artistic name, which had been retired 8 years before for the album Total. At the time he entered the studio to record his eighth album again, this time under the new genre chosen, bringing Eduardo Pepato as producer, the same as the work of Luan Santana and Thaeme & Thiago. According to Wanessa, the decision to change the musical genre was based on the personal identification of the sertanejo music: "The road to pop in Brazil, I do not identify myself. It is not my beach. My footprint is romanticism and the sertanejo is a strong brand of my next album. I'm doing what I believe."

In addition, the singer explained that she was looking to do great shows in arenas again: "I want to run Brazil with the structure that I have always wanted, with the electronic, I went through each situation." Soon after breaking with Sony Music, alleging disagreements about the course of his career, since the record company would not like it to leave the pop sound, signing soon after with the Work Show, producer responsible for launching the market sertanejo. The first track announced as part of the album was "Now I Know," written in honor of her husband. On June 15 a preview of "Vai que Vira Amor" is released.

Release
The album was released on August 19 exclusively for streaming and free digital download through Palco MP3, the best-known Brazilian online music portal. On October 14, 2016 is released for digital sale through iTunes and streaming independently by its producer Work Show. On December 20, 2016, Wanessa announces that he had signed with Som Livre and on March 10, 2017 the album is re-released by the label - this time also in physical form, in addition to the previous formats -, bringing two new songs as bonus.

Singles
On July 26, Wanessa released the first single from the album, "Coração Embriagado", composed by the country duo João Neto & Frederico in partnership with Gabriel do Cavaco, Shylton Fernandes and Diego Ferrari. The band's music video was released on July 29, showing the singer recording it in studio and playing on her guitar. The single was officially released on digital platforms on August 5. "Coração Embriagado" reached the position nineteen on Billboard Brasil, being the best result of his career until then.
"Vai que Vira Amor" was released as a second single on August 26 on digital platforms. The music video of the song was released two weeks earlier, on August 9, following the same line as the previous one, featuring the singer recording it in the studio.
"Anestesia", present in the re-release of the album, was released as third single on March 10, 2017.

Promotion
On August 20 he presented himself at the sixty-first edition of the Festa do Peão de Barretos, announcing his new work during the Maiara & Maraisa show, in which he sang with them "Coração Embriagado." On September 6 he plays for the first time on television the first single of the album, in the program Música Boa Ao Vivo. September 15 is the time to release the album on the program De Cara, on FM O Dia. On September 23, Wanessa is interviewed in the program of Jô, where he announces his new album, besides singing the tracks "Coração Embriagado" and "Vai Que Vira Amor". On October 5 she is interviewed in the talk show Programa do Porchat, where she explains the creative process of the album and sings the first single, besides "Perseguição". On January 27, 2017, it was Wanessa's turn to record the Sabadão com Celso Portiolli where he sang several of his old hits and the new single "Coração Embriagado" and released his CD. And on March 28 he participated in the Feast of the Mothers in Minas Gerais with Marília Mendonça and Maiara and Maraísa.

Critical reception

The album received negative reviews, being considered "Selling out" and "artificial". Emilio Faustino, from the iG portal, said that by choosing the backwoodsman, Wanessa made a choice "to be convenient if we consider the good phase of the female backwoods in Brazil." He also stated that "During the release of the new album the singer managed to get the heresy of labeling herself as" Camaleoa "(...) if you simply change to make more of it and lean on the success of something that you can not even identify sound of great opportunism and lack of personality."
The music critic Mauro Ferreira of the G1 said that the album "besides sounding artificial and strategic, represents a setback in Wanessa's (rather irregular) discography." Renan Guerra, from The Hatch, evaluated the album with a (1.5 / 5), saying that "Wanessa sounds cold during the almost 50 minutes of 33" and that "the whole production of the disc sounds sufficiently cast. It's as if Wanessa were a newcomer, trying to embrace at all costs the lynch of the university sertanejo, even though his music sounds pasteurized and apathetic."

Track listing

Release history

References

External links
 33 at Somlivre.com

Wanessa Camargo albums
2016 albums
Portuguese-language albums
Música sertaneja albums